Deepti (Nepali: दीप्ति) is a Hindu feminine given name, which means "the ray of hope". It basically means "a bright flame that blinds the eye". In Sanskrit, Deepti
, means "light", "glow", "shine", "brilliant" or "a person who spreads light to people around". It is also known by the spelling Deepthi/Deepthy in south India and Deepti/Dipti in north India.

List of people with the given name Deepti 

Deepti Bhatnagar (born September 30, 1967), Indian actress.
Deepti Naval (born 1952), Indian actress, director, writer, painter, and photographer.
Deepti Sati (born January 29, 1995), Indian actress and model.

Indian feminine given names